Kosovo Agency of Statistics is the national statistics bureau of Kosovo.

It was officially created in 1948, but restarted working as an independent agency in 1999. After Kosovo's declaration of independence in 2008, the ACK organized Kosovo's first population census in 2011. It is supported by international organizations and statistic agencies, like the OSCE, United Nations, etc. As of 2011, the bureau works within the Kosovo Prime Ministry framework.

See also 
 Demographics of Kosovo

Notes

References 

Organizations established in 1948
Kosovo
Organizations based in Kosovo
Demographics of Kosovo